Jakob Wolfensberger (born 21 April 1933) is a Swiss archer. He competed in the men's individual event at the 1972 Summer Olympics.

References

1933 births
Living people
Swiss male archers
Olympic archers of Switzerland
Archers at the 1972 Summer Olympics
Place of birth missing (living people)